Amyl and the Sniffers is the self-titled debut studio album by Australian pub rock and punk band Amyl and the Sniffers. It was released on 24 May 2019 by Rough Trade Records and has received generally positive reviews.

The album reached No. 22 in Australia and No. 91 on the UK Albums Chart.

At the ARIA Music Awards of 2019, the album won the ARIA Award for Best Rock Album.

Track listing

Charts

References

2019 debut albums
Amyl and the Sniffers albums
Rough Trade Records albums
Flightless (record label) albums